"Heart of Darkness" was an American television play broadcast on November 6, 1958, as part of the CBS television series, Playhouse 90.  It was the seventh episode of the third season of Playhouse 90. The play was adapted from Joseph Conrad's short story, Heart of Darkness.

Plot
Charles Marlow travels from England to Africa to reunite with Mr. Kurtz, the man who raised him. The two are reunited, and Kurtz seeks to brand Marlow as one of his slaves. Kurtz later dies in Marlow's arms.

Cast
The following performers received screen credit for their performances:

 Roddy McDowall as Charles Marlow
 Eartha Kitt as The Queen
 Oscar Homolka as The Doctor
 Cathleen Nesbitt as The Crone
 Richard Haydn as The Accountant
 Inga Swenson as Maria
 Boris Karloff as Mr. Kurtz
 Willard Sage as The Chaplain
 Fintan Meyler as The Woman
 Rusty Lane as Griggs
 Tom Palmer as The District Officer
 Nora O'Mahoney as Abbey

Sterling Hayden hosted the broadcast.

Production
The play was directed by Ronald Winston and produced by Fred Coe. The teleplay was written by Stewart Stern based on the story by Joseph Conrad. Robert Tyler Lee was the art director. Robert Drasnin, who is best known for his albums in the exotica genre, composed and directed the music.

Reception
In The New York Times, John P. Shanley wrote that called it "among the more pretentious mistakes of the season." He added the actors "were involved in a numbing exercise in dramatic mumbo-jumbo that was without merit or reason."

UPI television critic William Ewald wrote that Stern had so padded and twisted Conrad's story that it might be called "Variations on a Theme by Joseph Conrad." His overall reaction was that "it was a little like watching the lecture of a talented lunatic through the bottom of two martini glasses." As for the acting, he wrote that McDowall's performance "packed fits and starts of excellence" while Kitt was, "to put it kindly, inadequate", and Karloff was just "there."

In the Oakland Tribune, Bill Fiset wrote that the teleplay "led viewers a little too far off into fantasyland."

References

1958 American television episodes
Playhouse 90 (season 3) episodes
1958 television plays
Television shows based on works by Joseph Conrad
Works based on Heart of Darkness